Ambahita is a town and commune in Madagascar. It belongs to the district of Bekily, which is a part of Androy Region. The population of the commune was estimated to be approximately 14,000 in 2001 commune census.

Only primary schooling is available. The majority 90% of the population of the commune are farmers.  The most important crops are rice and sugarcane, while other important agricultural products are peanuts and cassava. Industry and services provide employment for 8% and 2% of the population, respectively.

References and notes 

Populated places in Androy